Changakul (Säñgekül) is a rural locality (a village) in Voyadinsky Selsoviet, Yanaulsky District, Bashkortostan, Russia. The population was 52 as of 2010. There are 3 streets.

Geography 
Changakul is located 38 km northwest of Yanaul (the district's administrative centre) by road. Voyady is the nearest rural locality.

References 

Rural localities in Yanaulsky District